Eric John Sever (born 1 April 1943) is a former Labour Party politician in England.

Sever was elected Member of Parliament for Birmingham Ladywood at a by-election in 1977. He served until 1983, when he was deselected as Labour candidate in favour of Sir Albert Bore. However, subsequent parliamentary boundary changes led to Bore being replaced by Clare Short, who had been selected as Labour candidate in the neighbouring constituency of Birmingham Handsworth, which was largely merged with Birmingham Ladywood. Sever instead stood in Meriden, a safe seat for the Conservative Party, but lost by 15,018 votes.

References 
Times Guide to the House of Commons, 1983

External links
 

1943 births
Living people
Labour Party (UK) MPs for English constituencies
UK MPs 1974–1979
UK MPs 1979–1983